The Rovelli Altarpiece is a 1539 oil on canvas painting by Moretto da Brescia, which since 1899 has been in the Pinacoteca Tosio Martinengo in Brescia, Italy. Strongly influenced by Titian, it is named after the schoolmaster Galeazzo Rovelli who commissioned it for the church of Santa Maria dei Miracoli in Brescia in 1539, where it remained until being removed in the 19th century and replaced by a copy. Its composition was reused by Moroni in his Mystic Marriage of Saint Catherine in the 1560s.

It shows Nicholas of Bari presenting two of Rovelli's pupils to the Madonna and Child, with two more behind the saint. One of the pupils in the foreground holds a mitre while the other holds a book and three gold balls, traditional attributes of St Nicholas.

References

Bibliography (in Italian)
Giulio Antonio Averoldi, Le scelte pitture di Brescia additate al forestiere, Brescia 1700
Camillo Boselli, Il Moretto, 1498-1554, in "Commentari dell'Ateneo di Brescia per l'anno 1954 - Supplemento", Brescia 1954
Bernardino Faino, Catalogo Delle Chiese riuerite in Brescia, et delle Pitture et Scolture memorabili, che si uedono in esse in questi tempi, Brescia 1630
Stefano Fenaroli, Alessandro Bonvicino soprannominato il Moretto pittore bresciano. Memoria letta all'Ateneo di Brescia il giorno 27 luglio 1873, Brescia 1875
Gustavo Frizzoni, Alessandro Bonvicino, detto il Moretto pittore bresciano e le fonti storiche riferentesi, in "Giornale di erudizione artistica", Brescia, giugno 1875
Max Jordan, Geschichte der Italienichen Malerei, Lipsia 1876
Francesco Paglia, Il Giardino della Pittura, Brescia 1630
Gaetano Panazza, I Civici Musei e la Pinacoteca di Brescia, Bergamo 1958
György Gombosi, Moretto da Brescia, Basel 1943
Federico Odorici, Storie Bresciane dai primi tempi sino all'età nostra, Brescia 1853
Francesco Paglia, Il Giardino della Pittura, Brescia 1675
Pier Virgilio Begni Redona, Alessandro Bonvicino – Il Moretto da Brescia, Editrice La Scuola, Brescia 1988
Carlo Ridolfi, Le maraviglie dell'arte Ouero le vite de gl'illvstri pittori veneti, e dello stato. Oue sono raccolte le Opere insigni, i costumi, & i ritratti loro. Con la narratione delle Historie, delle Fauole, e delle Moralità da quelli dipinte, Brescia 1648
Adolfo Venturi, Storia dell'arte italiana, volume IX, La pittura del Cinquecento, Milano 1929

1539 paintings
Paintings by Moretto da Brescia
Paintings of the Madonna and Child by Moretto da Brescia
Paintings in the collection of the Pinacoteca Tosio Martinengo
Paintings of Saint Nicholas
Altarpieces